Scheller is a German surname. Notable people with the surname include:

Ana Sophia Scheller (born 1986), New York City Ballet soloist
David Scheller (born 1971), German actor
Ernst Scheller (1899-1942), German politician
Friedrich Ernst Scheller (1791–1869), German jurist and politician
Frieder Scheller (born 1942), German chemist
Heini Scheller (1929–1957), Swiss rower
Herbert Scheller (born 1948), German footballer
Jürgen Scheller (1922–1996), German actor
Rob Scheller (born 1927), Dutch art historian
Steffen Scheller (born 1969), German politician
 Stuart Scheller, United States Marine Corps lieutenant colonel

See also
Robert von Scheller-Steinwartz (1865–1921), German diplomat and politician

German-language surnames
Surnames from nicknames